The Prix Belle de Nuit is a Group 3 flat horse race in France open to thoroughbred fillies and mares aged three years or older. It is run at Saint-Cloud over a distance of 2,800 metres (about 1¾ miles) each year in October or November.

History
The race was formerly held at Évry, where during the mid-1970s it was run over 1,800 metres. At this time it was classed at Listed level, and for a period it was restricted to three-year-olds. It was extended to 2,400 metres in 1978, and opened to four-year-olds in 1985.

The upper age limit was removed in 1994, when the race was temporarily switched to Saint-Cloud. It returned to Évry in 1995, and was run again at Saint-Cloud in 1996 and 1997. It began a seven-year spell at Maisons-Laffitte in 1998, and was increased to 2,500 metres in 2000. It reverted to 2,400 metres in 2003, and was restored to 2,500 metres in 2004.

For several years thereafter the Prix Belle de Nuit moved to various venues. It took place at Saint-Cloud in 2005, 2006 and 2008, and at Fontainebleau in 2007, 2009 and 2011. It was held at Deauville in 2010, and on this occasion it was run on an artificial surface over 2,400 metres.

The race's current period at Saint-Cloud began in 2012. It was promoted to Group 3 status and extended to 2,800 metres in 2018.

Records
Most successful horse since 1976 (2 wins):
 Sidara – 1987, 1988

Leading jockey since 1976 (5 wins):
 Freddy Head - Sevres (1977), Souveraine (1978), Eternity (1980), Princesse Vali (1982), Dancing Vaguely (1984)

Leading trainer since 1976 (5 wins):
 André Fabre – Sidara (1987, 1988), Hijaz (1999), Luna Sacra (2001), Sassella (2015)

Leading owner since 1976 (3 wins):
 HH Aga Khan IV – Kermiya (1976), Nawazish (1981), Behkara (2004)
 Alec Head – Sevres (1977), Souveraine (1978), Eternity (1980)
 Jean-Luc Lagardère – Majority (1979), Karmichah (1989), Luna Sacra (2001)

Winners since 1976

See also
 List of French flat horse races

References

 France Galop / Racing Post:
 horseracingintfed.com – International Federation of Horseracing Authorities – Prix Belle de Nuit (2018).
 pedigreequery.com – Prix Belle de Nuit (1976–2012).
 pedigreequery.com – Prix Belle de Nuit (2013–present).
 thefrenchblacktype.com – Prix Belle de Nuit.

Long-distance horse races for fillies and mares
Saint-Cloud Racecourse
Horse races in France